Troy Township is a township in Clarke County, Iowa, USA.  As of the 2000 census, its population was 1,021.

Geography
According to the USGS, it contains two cemeteries: Murray and Troy.

The stream of West Long Creek runs through this township.

References
 USGS Geographic Names Information System (GNIS)

External links
 US-Counties.com
 City-Data.com

Townships in Clarke County, Iowa
Townships in Iowa